Maaz Khan was (born 10 August 1990) in Karachi, Pakistan. He is a Three time Pakistani South Asian Games gold medallist in wushu. And National wushu Kung fu Team Captain, he is an employee of Karachi Port Trust, Sports Department.

2010
Khan won a gold medal at the 11th South Asian Games held in Dhaka, Bangladesh, in the Sanshou 65 kg category. Later that year, he took part in the Asian Games held in China.

2016
Khan won a gold medal at the 12th South Asian GAMES held in Guwahati Shillong, India, in the sanshou 70 kg category.

2017
Khan won a bronze medal in wushu at the 2017 Islamic Solidarity Games in Baku, Azerbaijan. He won a bronze medal in kickboxing at the Asian Indoor and Martial Arts Games in Turkmenistan.

2019
Khan won a gold medal at the 13th South Asian Games held in kathmandu, Nepal, in the sanshou 75 kg category.

References

1990 births
Living people
Asian Games competitors for Pakistan
South Asian Games gold medalists for Pakistan
Pakistani sanshou practitioners
Wushu practitioners at the 2010 Asian Games
Wushu practitioners at the 2018 Asian Games
South Asian Games medalists in wushu
Islamic Solidarity Games competitors for Pakistan